Shotgun Wedding is a 2013 American black comedy film directed by Danny Roew and starring Mike Damus, Kim Shaw, and Joel McKinnon Miller. Produced by Fox Digital Studio, it premiered on Netflix on April 1, 2013.

Plot
While drunk, Robert (Mike Damus), the groom-to-be, 'accidentally' shoots the maid of honor of his fiance in the face during a skeet-shooting event, and his scheming mother does whatever needed to ensure the wedding will occur, even to conspire with her ex-husband or kidnap the maid of honor.

References

External links
 
 

2013 films
American black comedy films
2013 black comedy films
Films about weddings
Films with screenplays by Patrick Casey (writer)
Films with screenplays by Josh Miller (filmmaker)
2010s English-language films
2010s American films